Râșca is a commune located in Suceava County, Romania. It is composed of five villages: Buda, Dumbrăveni, Jahalia, Râșca and Slătioara. The name Râșca comes from the Slavic word "речка" which is a diminutive of the word "река" meaning "river".

References

Communes in Suceava County
Localities in Western Moldavia